Anthony Wint (born September 14, 1995) is an American professional gridiron football linebacker who is a free agent. He played college football at FIU.

Early life and high school
Wint was born and grew up in Homestead, Florida and attended Homestead High School, where he played football and wrestled. He was named second-team All-Dade County as a senior and sophomore and to the third-team as a junior. As a junior, Wint was named first-team All-Dade County in wrestling after posting 37–4 record and competed in the FHSAA state championship tournament. Wint committed to play college football at Florida International University over offers from Syracuse, Coastal Carolina, Western Kentucky and
Monmouth.

College career
Wint played four seasons for the FIU Panthers football team and earned a starting spot at linebacker during his freshman season. As a freshman, he was named to the Conference USA All-Freshman and honorable mention All-Conference USA and was named second-team All-Conference USA sophomore, junior and senior years. Over the course of his collegiate career Wint accumulated 336 tackles (second in FIU history), seven fumble recoveries, 1.5 sacks, one interception, five passes defensed and three forced fumbles.

Professional career

New York Jets
Wint was signed by the New York Jets as an undrafted free agent on May 7, 2018 after his performance in a rookie minicamp. He was cut by the Jets at the end of training camp and subsequently re-signed to the team's practice squad on September 2, 2018. Wint was promoted to the Jets' active roster on December 19, 2018 after tackle Brandon Shell was placed on injured reserve. Wint made his NFL debut on December 23, 2018 in a 44–38 loss to the Green Bay Packers, recording one tackle and forcing a fumble.

On August 31, 2019, Wint was waived by the Jets.

Hamilton Tiger-Cats
Wint was signed by the Hamilton Tiger-Cats of the Canadian Football League (CFL) on December 19, 2019. After the CFL canceled the 2020 season due to the COVID-19 pandemic, Wint chose to opt-out of his contract with the Tiger-Cats on August 31, 2020.

References

External links
FIU Panthers bio
New York Jets bio

Living people
1995 births
American football linebackers
FIU Panthers football players
Hamilton Tiger-Cats players
New York Jets players
People from Homestead, Florida
Players of American football from Florida
Sportspeople from Miami-Dade County, Florida